Sylkie Monoff is a German born Singer-Songwriter and Music Producer and has appeared in films.

Life 

Born in Wuppertal, she studied music at the Hamburg Conservatory. Her debut album Harbor in the Night BMG Ariola spawned the radio hit "Don't!". The English group BND recorded her song "All the Places", which landed in the top 50 sales charts in Germany and was also awarded Gold (50,000 sold) status in Poland. Her single "The Puzzle" was produced by Mark Schulman
(drummer for Pink, Cher, Foreigner).

Monoff's 2010 album Genuine, which reached #1, features Nashville’s top studio musicians including, Eddie Bayers and Brent Mason. She has shared the stage with Albert Lee, Julian Dawson, Iain Matthews, Spencer Davis, Howard Carpendale and Melissa Etheridge. She has also appeared in 
the films Manta, Manta (by Oscar-winning producer Bernd Eichinger) and King Ping. Monoff has won "Best International Country Artist" by the Independent Music Network.

In 2020, the digital re-release of Sylkie Monoff's album "Harbor In The Night" ranked in the Top 50 of the Apple Music Country Album Charts in Germany.

Monoff's single "Still Believe In You" is on the Grammy® Awards 2022 ballots in two categories, "Best Country Song" and "Best Country Solo Performance". She wrote and produced the track. It was released on Monoff's own label SYWA Nashville. In addition, she is currently nominated for the Independent Music Network Award 2022 as "Comeback Artist Of The Year". Monoff continues to write and record in Nashville.

Albums
Harbor in the Night (1993/2013 BMG)
Genuine (2010)
Harbor in the Night (2020 SYWA Nashville) (Digital Re-Release)

Singles 
 Your Eyes (1992 BMG Ariola)
 Don't! (1993 BMG Ariola)  
 Here You Come Again (2013 GMO The Label)
 Like Rain (2017 GMO The Label)
 The Puzzle (2018 Monoff Music)
 Still Believe In You (2021 SYWA Nashville)

Filmography 

 1991: Manta, Manta
 2013: King Ping

References

External links 
 

German singer-songwriters
Living people
Year of birth missing (living people)
Musicians from Wuppertal